Small hydro is the development of hydroelectric power on a scale suitable for local community and industry, or to contribute to distributed generation in a regional electricity grid. Exact definitions vary, but a "small hydro" project is less than 50 megawatts (MW), and can be further subdivide by scale into "mini" (<1MW), "micro" (<100 kW), "pico" (<10 kW). In contrast many hydroelectric projects are of enormous size, such as the generating plant at the Three Gorges Dam at 22,500 megawatts or the vast multiple projects of the Tennessee Valley Authority.

Small hydro projects may be built in isolated areas that would be uneconomic to serve from a national electricity grid, or in areas where a national grid does not exist.

Description
The use of the term "small hydro" varies considerably around the world, the maximum limit is usually somewhere between 10 and 30 MW. While a minimum limit is not usually set, the US National Hydropower Association specifies a minimum limit of 5 MW. In California, hydroelectric generating stations with a maximum capacity of less than 30 MW are classified as small, and are eligible for inclusion in the state's renewable portfolio standard, while hydroelectric generating stations with a higher capacity are classified as large and are not considered renewable. In India, hydro projects up to 25 MW station capacities have been categorized as Small Hydro Power (SHP) projects.

Small hydro can be further subdivided into mini hydro, usually defined as 100 to 1,000 kilowatts (kW), and micro hydro which is 5 to 100 kW. Micro hydro is usually the application of hydroelectric power sized for smaller communities, single families or small enterprise. The smallest installations are pico hydro, below 5 kW.

Since small hydro projects usually have correspondingly small civil construction work and little or no reservoir, they are seen as having a relatively low environmental impact compared to large hydro.

Growth
According to a report by REN21, during 2008 small hydro installations grew by 28% over year 2005 to raise the total world small hydro capacity to 85 gigawatts (GW). Over 70% of this was in China (with 65 GW), followed by Japan (3.5 GW), the United States (3 GW) and India (2 GW). Global growth is expected to be 2.8% annually until the mid-2020s when capacity will be about 150 gigawatts.

China planned to electrify a further 10,000 villages between 2005 and 2010 under their China Village Electrification Program, including further investments in small hydro and photovoltaics. By 2010, China had 45,000 small hydro installations, especially in rural areas, producing 160 Twh annually. Over 50% of the world's potential small hydro power was found in Asia; however, the report noted, "It is possible in the future that more small hydropower potential might be identified both on the African and American continents".

In the mountains and rain forests of British Columbia, Canada there are a great many sites suitable for hydro development. However environmental concerns towards large reservoirs after the 1980s halted new dam construction. The solution to coping with increased demand was to offer contracts to independent power producers, who have built 100 run of the river projects under 50 MW. Power production without reservoirs varies dramatically, but older conventional dams retain or release water to average out production though the year. In 2014 these independent producers generated 18,000 GWh from 4,500 MW of capacity.

Generation

Hydroelectric power is the generation of electric power from the movement of water. A  hydroelectric facility requires a dependable flow of water and a reasonable height for the water to fall, called the head. In a typical installation, water is fed from a reservoir through a pipe into a turbine. The water flowing through the turbine causes an electrical generator to rotate, converting the motion into electrical energy.

Small hydro may be developed by constructing new facilities or through re-development of existing dams whose primary purpose is flood control, or irrigation. Old hydro sites may be  re-developed, sometimes salvaging substantial investment in the installation such as penstock pipe and turbines, or just re-using the water rights associated with an abandoned site. Either of these cost saving advantages can make the return on investment for a small hydro site well worth the use of existing sites.

Project design
Many companies offer standardized turbine generator packages in the approximate size range of 200 kW to 10 MW. These "water to wire" packages simplify the planning and development of the site since one vendor looks after most of the equipment supply. Because non-recurring engineering costs are minimized and development cost is spread over multiple units, the cost of such package systems is reduced.  While synchronous generators capable of isolated plant operation are often used, small hydro plants connected to an electrical grid system can use economical induction generators to further reduce installation cost and simplify control and operation.

Small "run of the river" projects do not have a conventional dam with a reservoir, only a weir to form a headpond for diversion of inlet water to the turbine. Unused water simply flows over the weir and the headpond may only be capable of a single day's storage, not enough for dry summers or frozen winters when generation may come to a halt. A preferred scenario is to have the inlet in an existing lake.

Modular “micro hydrokinetic” systems have been developed for irrigation canals. "Irrigation districts across the U.S. have installed power plants at diversion points and in-canal drops, which are traditionally used for flow measurement, to stabilize upstream heads and to dissipate energy where there is significant elevation change throughout the canal system."

Countries like India and China have policies in favor of small hydro, and the regulatory process allows for building dams and reservoirs. In North America and Europe the regulatory process is too long and expensive to consider having a dam and a reservoir for a small project.

Small hydro projects usually have faster environmental and licensing procedures, and since the equipment is usually in serial production, standardized and simplified, and the civil works construction is also reduced, the projects may be developed very rapidly. The physically smaller size of equipment makes it easier to transport to remote areas without good road or rail access.

One measure of decreased environmental impact with lakes and reservoirs depends on the balance between stream flow and power production. Reducing water diversions helps the river's ecosystem, but reduces the hydro system's return on Investment (ROI). The hydro system design must strike a balance to maintain both the health of the stream and the economics.

Sample list of small installations worldwide
Africa
Zengamina, a 700 kW plant in Kalene Hill, Mwinilunga District in northwestern Zambia. 2008
Asia
Meenvallam Small Hydroelectric Project, Palakkad district, Kerala, India.
Bario Asal & Arur Layun Micro-Hydro Community Project, Kelabit Highlands, Sarawak, Malaysia. 2009
Ambangal Mini Hydro Electric Power Plant, Kiangan, Ifugao, Philippines (2010)
Asiga River Mini Hydro Electric Power Plant, Santiago, Agusan del Norte, Philippines (2019)
Balongbong Mini Hydro Electric Power Plant, Bato, Catanduanes, Philippines (1983)
Cantingas Mini Hydro Electric Power Plant, San Fernando, Romblon, Philippines (2009)
Likud Mini Hydro Electric Power Plant, Asipulo and Kiangan, Ifugao, Philippines (2015)
New Bataan Hydro Electric Power Plant, New Bataan, Davao de Oro, Philippines (2018)
San Luis Mini Hydro Electric Power Plant, San Luis, Aurora, Philippines (2011)
Villasiga Mini Hydro Electric Power Plant, Bugasong, Antique, Philippines (2016)
Pakpattan Hydro Power Project, a 2.82 MW plant on Pakpattan Canal in Pakpattan District, Pakistan 2015
Europe
Green Valleys Project, Brecon Beacons National Park, Wales.  Joint winner of £300K in Big Green Challenge 2009.
St Catherine's, a National Trust site near Windermere, Westmorland, United Kingdom.
North America
Ames Hydroelectric Generating Plant, Colorado, United States. On the List of IEEE Milestones
Childs-Irving Hydroelectric Facilities, Arizona, United States. 1916 Now decommissioned 
Snoqualmie Falls, Washington, United States. 1957
Malibu Hydro, British Columbia, Canada. 2005
Menihek Hydroelectric Generating Station, Newfoundland and Labrador, Canada. 1954
Cloudworks Energy is one of many Independent power producers that have built projects in British Columbia, Canada

See also

Electricity generation
Hydro power
Low head hydro power
Micro hydro up to 100 kW
Pico hydro up to 5 kW
Conduit hydroelectricity
International Center on Small Hydro Power

References

Hydroelectricity
Power station technology
Renewable energy
Distributed generation